Australia competed at the 2004 Summer Paralympics in Athens, Greece. It was Australia's 12th year of participation at the Paralympics. The team included 151 athletes (91 men and 60 women). Australian competitors won 101 medals (26 gold, 39 silver and 36 bronze) to finish fifth in the gold medal table and second on the total medal table. Australia competed in 12 sports and won medals in 8 sports. The Chef de Mission was Paul Bird. The Australian team was smaller than the Sydney Games due to a strict selection policy related to the athletes' potential to win a medal and the International Paralympic Committee's decision to remove events for athletes with an intellectual disability from the Games due to issues of cheating at the Sydney Games. This was due to a cheating scandal with the Spanish intellectually disabled basketball team in the 2000 Summer Paralympics where it was later discovered that only two players actually had intellectual disabilities. The IPC decision resulted in leading Australian athletes such as Siobhan Paton and Lisa Llorens not being able to defend their Paralympic titles. The 2000 summer paralympic games hosted in Sydney Australia proved to be a milestone for the Australian team as they finished first on the medal tally for the first time in history. In comparing Australia's 2000 Paralympic performance and their 2004 performance, it is suggested that having a home advantage might affect performance.

Outstanding performers 
 Swimmer Matthew Cowdrey at age 15, was the youngest member of the Australian Paralympic Team, and at his first Paralympic Games he won three gold, two silver and two bronze medals, and finished the meet with two World & Paralympic Record times. His amazing achievements were recognised and he received the Medal of the Order of Australia, were named Young Paralympian of the Year at the Australian Paralympian of the Year Awards and Swimmer of the Year with a Disability by Swimming Australia.
Swimmer Chantel Wolfenden, also in her first ever Paralympic Games, won gold, silver and four bronze during the games while also setting a new personal record in the 400m Freestyle. For her great accomplishments she received the Medal of the Order of Australia
 Prue Watt, another first time Paralympian swimmer, established herself as one of the most successful Australian athletes during the 2004 Games, winning five silver medals and one bronze medal. To honor her accomplishments she was awarded the 2004 Female Junior Paralympian of the Year for her achievements
 Tim Sullivan won four gold medals in athletics sprints events, three of which were individual and two of which involved new world records. To celebrate his amazing achievements, he was named Australian Paralympian of the Year by the Australian Paralympic Committee [APC], and won the Victorian Institute of Sport's [VIS] Athlete with a Disability Award
 Ben Austin won four individual medals as a swimmer, one gold, two silver and one bronze. He was also part of the 4 × 100 m Freestyle Relay team and 4 × 100 m Medley Relay where they won silver and gold In the 100m freestyle he became one of the first ever swimmers in the S8 category to break the one minute barrier. For his accomplishments at the 2004 Games he received the Medal of the Order of Australia
 Cyclist Lindy Hou qualified for her first Paralympic Games in 2004 with pilots Janelle Lindsay and Toireasa Gallagher. The Games became a huge success and she won a total of four medals, one gold, two silver and one bronze. She and Janelle Lindsey also became the first Australian female athletes to win gold during the 2004 Paralympic games. They also set the world record in the Women's 200m Fly with the time 11.675 seconds. Her accomplishments were celebrated with the Medal of the Order of Australia
 Heath Francis won two individual silver medals and one bronze medal. He was also part of the Men's 4 × 400 m T42-T46 relay team and Men's 4 × 100 m T42-T46 where they won silver and bronze.
Some of the other outstanding Australian athletes included:
 Six athletes won three medals - Don Elgin, Neil Fuller, Kurt Fearnley and Darren Thrupp in athletics and Kieran Modra and Christopher Scott in cycling.

Background of the Athens Games 

The 2004 Summer Paralympics, formally known as Games of the XXVIII Olympiad, was held from September 17 to September 28. The twelfth Paralympic Games, a total of 3,808 competitors (2,643 Men and 1,165 Women) from 135 countries participated. During these games 304 World Records were broken with 448 Paralympic Games Records being broken across 19 different sports. Addition of judo and sitting volleyball for women and football 5-a-side for men were included. The ticket sale for event saw a decrease in tickets sold, with about 850.000 tickets for the different competitions compared to 1.2 million sold at the 2000 Sydney games. The event was made possible through the help of 8,863 volunteers

Opening and Closing Ceremony 

Louise Sauvage, a nine-time Paralympic gold medalist, lit the cauldron during the opening ceremonies for the 2000 Summer Paralympics in Sydney. On September 17, 2004, Sauvage carried the Australian flag into the opening ceremony stadium, "Spyridon Louis", at what was her 4th Paralympic games. She has a Sydney ferry, a street and a pathway named after her, as well as numerous school sport houses around Australia. After the parade of nations, the Games were declared opened by IPC President Sir Philip Craven and Greek president Cistis Stephanopoulos, before the Paralympic flame was lit by Georgios Toptsis. The opening ceremony was seen by 72,000 spectators in the stadium

Swimmer Matthew Cowdrey, recognized for his achievements during the games, was chosen to carry the Australia flag at the Closing Ceremony of the Games. The closing ceremony during the 2004 games was cut short and only entailed the protocol segments required to complete the Games, due to a tragic accident involving the deaths of seven high school students on their way to the Games. One minute of silence in tribute to the school students were held as the Paralympic flag flew half-mast. Australian gold medalist, Katrina Webb, who were critical of the Paralympic Organizers who removed the party element of the closing ceremony and thus leaving only the athletes' entry, the Paralympic President Phil Craven's speech and the handover of the flag to Beijing, said "Things like this happen, you can't stop everything. Life goes on. We should make sure we pay our respects in that regard but things should continue as they were."

The closing ceremony ended with the unveiling of the IPC's new logo

Factors affecting Australia’s performance 
In 2000, Australia hosted both the Olympic and the Paralympic games with the Australian team's performance, more specifically the summer Paralympic team, being remarkable. For the first time in history, Australia placed first on the total medal tally for the summer Paralympics, with a total of 314 medals. This result was studied in the relation to the possibility of athletes having a home advantage, measured using a 'market share', which is measured by dividing the number of total medals won (with gold being 3 points, silver equating to 2 points and bronze being 1 point) by the total number of medals contested at the Paralympic games. In the 2000 games, the Australian team presented a home market share of 9.50%. At the 1996 US Paralympic games prior, Australia's market share was 7.27% and in the 2004 Athens Paralympics, it was 6.15%. It is proposed that there was only a home advantage for a few sports which included athletics, table tennis and wheelchair fencing. An investigation into whether there is a correlation between being communist country and sporting performance verses being a capitalist country and sporting performance was also launched. It has been argued that in communist regimes, a higher amount of resources is allocated to the sports as “communist countries use success in top-level sports to display the benefits of their political system” as well as exhibiting their “internal political stability”.

It should also be noted that there are multiple socioeconomic determinants that contribute to a country’s performance at the summer Paralympics. Inevitably, success of a country is randomly distributed at the Paralympics. An investigation into these contributing factors has been launched. “While some countries dominate a particular sport discipline, other countries have elite athletes in various sports, or have little or no success in sports at all”. It has been proposed that countries that are more economically prosperous than others and have subsequently higher success rates across all sports. These countries are able to invest more resources into top-level sports as well as investing more effort into ensuring they have a healthy population to enable maximum sporting performance. Research has also been conducted on communist countries as it has been proposed that these nations utilise their success in top-level sports to exhibit the benefits of their political system. Expenditure on health and population size both also have a positive correlation on a country’s sporting performance. “This reflects a basic law of large numbers in the sense that larger populations will…have more talented athletes”. Carrying on, the degree to which a nation supports the integration of a disabled person into the sporting world, is also positively correlated to the nation’s success at the Paralympics. The more accommodating and understanding a country is in relation to ensuring disabled individuals have equal access to facilities and services, the increased feelings of inclusive and thus desire to represent their country in sport. Thus, the size of the countries Paralympic team reflects how much political priority is given to support their disabled athletes.

Another factor that affected Australia’s performance was the introduction of technological advances that assisted Paralympic athletes in their performance. Prosthetic and wheelchair technology are necessities for citizens with disabilities to conduct their day to day activities. However, application of certain technology into the sporting world can prove controversial and be unfair. It has been conducted through research that in the 2008 Beijing games, some track and field athletes in both the Paralympic and Olympic games wore clothing with a specific type of material that provided an unfair advantage. The clothing was manufactured by Nike and contained threads of vectran fibre which was found to “reduce drag by 7% when compared with the 2004 outfits”. Thus, it can be argued that some technological advancements that were utilised in the 2004 Paralympic games provided an unfair advantage amongst other participants including Australian parathletes.

Australia’s past performance 
As hosts of the 2000 Olympic and the Paralympic games, the Australian population had high expectations for the Australian athletes in these games. Notably, this was the first Paralympic games ever to be hosted in the Southern hemisphere. Overall, the 2000 Paralympic games attracted 3,879 para athletes, 285 being Australian para athletes. This was 120 more para athletes than the 1996 Atlanta Paralympic team and 134 more than 2004 Athens Paralympic team. The Paralympic games saw 122 nations compete across 18 sports. In total, the Australian team comprised 30 intellectually disabled athletes, which at the time, was the largest number the team had ever had. Overall, there were 20 multiple gold medallists in the team.  One notable athlete is Siobhan Paton, a Paralympic swimmer with an intellectual disability, who won the most gold medals than any other Australian in the 2000 games, coming away with 6 in total. However, in the 2004 games she was unable to uphold these titles due to the temporary banning of intellectually disabled athletes.

Development and preparation 
The 2004 Olympics and Paralympics was the largest event Athens had ever hosted and thus, it was paramount that the games ran safely and timely. This required thorough planning to ensure the games operated smoothly and problem free. Large consideration for how the large number of participants, coaches, visitors, workers, volunteers were all going to gather in a relatively small geographic area was needed as ensuring their safety was of number one priority. The Olympic Planning Unit (OPU) played a crucial part in the planning of these games as they decided what was lacking and therefor needed of local public health agencies, identified possible health risks that could be exposed to the public and worked collaboratively with other government agencies. Inevitably, international travel is associated with public health risks such as increased accidents and increased overall morbidity. The Greek government accounted for the possibility of new diseases that were previously not endemic to the city of Athens being imported due to the increase in tourists and travellers. As a precaution, the Greek health authorities sorted possible diseases into non-infectious and infectious disease and then categorised in terms of their probability of  occurring as their high or low priority.

With 7,000 people expected to attend these Paralympic games, it was recognised that delivery of food was of large concern and importance. The Organising committee for the Olympic games established that there was to be 3 main restaurants situated within the Olympic village for participants. Overall, 250 chefs and 250 assistants were employed to ensure the smooth preparation of around 50,000 expected daily meals to fed the village residents. Continuing on, multiple catering companies and outdoor vendors were hired to offer meals around the various Paralympic venues.

Another concern that was raised in the preparation of the games, was the high possibility of the transmission of airborne viruses particularly within indoor venues. More specifically, influenza was of main concern as a considerable portion of athletes and visitors were arriving from the southern hemisphere, including Australians, where it is highly prevalent. An evaluation of non-infectious illnesses such as heat illness was assessed. This was regarded as high importance as heat was a major issue in the 1996 Atlanta games which saw high levels of humidity and temperatures. The elected venues for the games such as the hotels, swimming pools and toilets underwent inspections 2 years prior to the commencement of the games and from there, were checked on a regular basis up until September 2004 when the Paralympic games closed. However, upon post-event analysis of the games, it was proposed that the relatively low number of visitors may partly be due to the international political position. Overall, the extensive planning conducted prior and during the games proved paramount for the access of both the Olympic and Paralympic games.

Counter terrorism efforts were also made as attention to this was catalysed from the 1996 Atlanta games. 111 people were injured from an exploding bomb during these games.

Sport-specific criteria 
During the 2000 summer Paralympic games, a cheating scandal took place with the Spanish basketball team. Gold medals were awarded to 10 members of the team which was revoked later in the same year when it was uncovered that 10 out of the 12 members on the team had intellectual disabilities. This scandal lead to the implementation of a more thorough and objective criteria that Paralympic athletes must meet prior to their participation in the games. Working cooperatively, the International Sports Federation for Para-athletes with an Intellectual Disability (INAS-ID) and the International Paralympic committee (IPC) established a rigid criterion for selection to combat future cheating and scandals. The first process that athletes must go through is ensuring all competitors claiming to have an impairment of their intellectual functioning, must fit the primary eligibility criteria set out by the American Association on Intellectual and developmental disability’s (AAIDD) definition of having an intellectual disability. According to the AAIDD, they propose that "Intellectual disability is a disability characterized by significant limitation both in intellectual functioning and in adaptive behaviour as expressed in conceptual, social, and practical adaptive skills…this disability originates before the age of 18". Continuing on, it has been established that receiving an IQ below 75, indicates  significant impairment in intellectual functioning. Athletes must also exhibit performance that is at a minimum of 2 standard deviations below the mean on a measure that has been standardised within one or more of the 3 categories of adaptive behaviours; practical, conceptual or practical skills. This new criteria for the selection of the athletes was not implemented in time for the 2004 games, meaning certain athletes were unable to defend their Olympic title such as Australian swimmer Siobhan Paton and Track athlete Lisa Llorens.

In the 2000 Summer Sydney Paralympic games, Siobhan Paton acquired a total of 6 gold medals and set 9 world records whilst doing so. She was also named “Paralympian of the Year” by the Australian Paralympic Committee. In 2004, she also competed in the INAS-FID (International Sports federation for people with an intellectual disability) world championships where she won a total of 14 gold medals and 3 silver medals. She also completed in the Global games later on in the same year where, unsurprisingly, won 3 gold medals, two silver and 2 bronze. Track athlete Lisa Llorens specialised in high jumping, long jumping and sprinting. In the 2000 Summer Sydney Paralympic games, she won 3 gold medals, in. the 200 metre sprint, high jump and long jump whilst also receiving a silver medal in the 100 metre sprint. Astonishingly, she also broke the long jump world record 3 times. She was also granted the opportunities to carry the Paralympic torch into the Stadium for the 2000 Sydney games, to which she did so with great pride

These Paralympic athletes were unable to defend their titles due to the International Paralympic committee’s decision to eliminate events for athletes with intellectual disabilities. Unfortunately, this IPC decision caused Paton to fall into depression as she felt she didn’t not meet the disability requirements anymore. It wasn’t until after the 2008 Paralympic games, that a specific and rigorous criterion had been created, and thus the ban had been lifted for intellectually disabled athletes'.

Media coverage 
The 2000 Summer Paralympics in Sydney had the most comprehensive media coverage; and highest TV ratings ever experienced by a Paralympic Games for its time laying down the solid foundations for media surround the 2004 Summer Paralympics in Australia. The Athens Paralympics saw record media attendance with a total of 3,103 media representatives, including more than 66 broadcasters. The Paralympics were shown in 49 countries in addition to being broadcast worldwide via Eurosport and Reuters. A study of the broadcast coverage revealed approximately 1.86 billion viewers in total, distributed on 617 hours of coverage. The increase in media attendance is thought be attributed to the introduction of 5-a-side Football. The development in media attendance and coverage confirms that the media's interest in the Paralympis Games Since the Sydney 2000 Paralympics has grown.

Medal tally
There were 518 Medal events at the games. Australia brought home 101 medals, including a record 26 gold medals. The 2004 Paralympic Games in Athens were a precursor to the 2008 Summer Paralympics in Beijing. China dominated the medal count with more goal medals, more silver medals and more medals overall than any other nation. Australia had the second highest medal tally overall, which were 16% higher than it was in 1984.

Medalists 

| width="78%" align="left" valign="top" |

| width="22%" align="left" valign="top" |

Events

Archery

Officials - Vicki O'Brien (Manager)

|-
|align=left|Natalie Cordowiner
|align=left|Women's individual standing
|505
|15
|N/A
|L 126-136
|colspan=4|did not advance
|}

Athletics

After the highly successful 2000 Summer Paralympic games where Australia finished the number one country in athletics, the goal for the 2004 Games were to finish aa a top three nation. After the dust had settled, Australia was number two on the athletics medal table and completed their best away Games ever.

Men's track

Men's field

Women's track

Women's field

Coaches - Scott Goodman (Head),  Paul Angel, Richard Bednall, Andrew Dawes, Iryna Dvoskina, John Eden, Brett Jones, Gary Lees,  Alison O'Riordan

Officials - Andrew Faichney (Manager), Louise Mogg, Paul Rohwer, Greg Jones, Jodie Carey

Cycling

Australia were top of the medal table in cycling.

Men's road race

Men's track cycling (pairs / teams)

Men's track cycling (individual)

Women's road race

Women's track cycling

Coaches - Kevin McIntosh (Head), Darryl Benson, Andrew Budge

Officials - Elsa Lepore (Manager), John Beer, Paul Lamond

Equestrian

Individual

Mixed team

Coaches - Gillian Rickard (Head), Anne Hall

Officials - Sue Cusack (Manager), Judy Fyfe

Judo

Men

Women

Coach - Trevor Kschammer (Head), Lara Sullivan

Powerlifting

Men

Women

Coaches – Martin Leach (Coach),  Michael Farrell

Darren Gardiner originally finished third but was awarded the silver medal after Habibollah Mousavi, gold medallist in +100 kg was disqualified after a positive doping test.

Sailing

Australia represented in sailing: 
Men - Jamie Dunross, Colin Harrison, Jeff Milligan, Peter Thompson

Coaches – Lachlan Gilbert (Head),  Geoff Chambers

Australia failed to win any medals in the two sailing events.

Shooting

Men

Women

Coaches - Miroslav Sipek(Head), Hans Heiderman 
Officials - Michelle Fletcher (Manager), Craig Jarvis, Elizabeth Ziebarth

Swimming

Men

Women

Coaches - Brendan Keogh (Head), John Beckworth, Peter Bishop, Graeme Carroll, Gwen Godfrey, Paul Simms

Officials - Adam Luscombe (Manager), Zoe Young, Brendan Burkett,

Wheelchair basketball

Men
Before the Athens 2004 wheelchair basketball competition, the men's team, popularly called The Rollers, goal was to improve their fifth place from Sydney. With the help of quality leadership from both staff and senior players they succeeded and won the silver medal playing against Canada.
Brendan Dowler 
Justin Eveson 
Andrew Flavel 
Adrian King
Tristan Knowles
Campbell Message
Grant Mizens
Brad Ness
Shaun Norris 
Troy Sachs 
David Selby
Daryl Taylor
The silver medal would not have been possible without a great collective effort from the coaches or managerial staff.

Coaching and managerial staff
Head coach: Murray Treseder
Assistant: Coach Alan Cox
Manager: Kelvin Browner
Video Technician/Assistant: Coach Craig Friday
Mechanic: Graham Gould
Physiotherapist: John Camens
Mechanic: Troy Andrews 
General Assistant in the USA: Rick Browner
Basketball Australia and APC office staff

Results

Looking to improve from their loss in the Sydney 2000 Paralympics wheelchair final, the women's Wheelchair basketball team, also called The Gliders, went undefeated through the preliminary rounds beating US, Great Britain and the Netherlands. In the quarterfinal they beat Mexico before they moved on to beat Germany in the semifinals. In the finals, the US awaited. For the second time in as many Paralympic games, The Gliders were unable to overcome US, but won the silver medal. The Gliders team, consisting of a total of 12 women, had seven first time Paralympians so the silver medal was a great accomplishment.

Women
Lisa Chaffey 
Shelley Chaplin 
Paula Coghlan
Melanie Domaschenz 
Karen Farrell
Kylie Gauci 
Tina McKenzie 
Alison Mosely
Jane Sachs
Sarah Stewart
Liesl Tesch
Melinda Young

Coaching staff
Head coach: Garry Hewson
Assistant coach: Darryl Durham
Manager: Sonia Healy
Mechanic: Michael Dowling

Results

Coaches and officials
Coaches: Alan Cox, Darryl Durham, Craig Friday, Gerry Hewson, Bernard Treseder.

Officials - Kelvin Browner, Michael Dowling, Sonia Healy (Manager).

Wheelchair rugby

The men's rugby team didn't win any medals: they were 5th out of 12.

Players
Bryce Alman
Ryley Batt 
Grant Boxall
Brett Boylan 
Brad Dubberley 
Nazim Erdem
George Hucks
Kevin Kersnovske 
Steve Porter
Patrick Ryan
Ryan Scott
Scott Vitale

Results

Coaches and officials
Coaches: Glenn Stephens and Terry Vinyard

Officials: Robert Doidge, Kim Ellwood and Maria Spiller.

Wheelchair tennis

Men

Women

Coaches - Greg Crump (Head)

Officials - Sallee Trewin (Manager)

Administration
Headquarters staff - Paul Bird (Chef de Mission), Ken Brown (Assistant Chef de Mission), Nick Dean (Assistant Chef de Mission), Doug Denby (Assistant Chef de Mission), Jason Hellwig (Director of Operations), Natalie Jenkins (Sports Administration Officer),  Jacqui Knife (Sports Administration Officer), Richard Mathews (Attache), Stephen Mathews (Manager Security), Tony Naar (Manager Sport), Graeme Watts  Sports Medicine and Sports Science - Syd Bourke (Director Medical), John Camens, Lily Chiu, Liz Cloughessy (Medical Coordinator), Kieran Cusack, Maria Di Michele, Mick Jordan, David Lee, Murray Lydeamore (Welfare Coordinator), Mark MacDonald, Ingrid McKay, Claire Nichols, David Spurrier, Greg Ungerer, Luke Vladich Media - Graham Cassidy, Katie Hodge, Margaret McDonald, David Lutteral

See also
Australia at the Paralympics
Australia at the 2004 Summer Olympics

References

External links
 Australian Paralympic Committee Media Guide Athens 2004
 Australian Paralympic Committee Annual Report 2003-2004- reports from the Australian team.
 International Paralympic Committee Historical Results Database - detailed listing of results

Nations at the 2004 Summer Paralympics
2004
Summer Paralympics